Sumaya Komuntale (born 3 August 2003), also spelled Sumayah Komuntale, is a Ugandan footballer who plays as a left back for FUFA Women Super League club Tooro Queens FC and the Uganda women's national team.

Early life
Komuntale was raised in Kyenjojo and belongs to the Toro people.

Club career
Komuntale has played for Tooro Queens in Uganda.

International career
Komuntale capped for Uganda at senior level during the 2022 Africa Women Cup of Nations qualification.

References

External links

2003 births
Living people
People from Kyenjojo District
Ugandan women's footballers
Women's association football fullbacks
Uganda women's international footballers
Toro people
21st-century Ugandan women